The action of 29 February 1916 was a naval engagement fought during the First World War between the United Kingdom and the German Empire. , a German commerce raider, broke out into the North Sea and Admiral Sir John Jellicoe dispatched Royal Navy warships to intercept the raider. Four British vessels intercepted the commerce raider Greif. The armed merchant cruiser  and Greif fought a brief engagement before British reinforcements arrived when both were severely damaged, both being sunk.

Background
Alcantara was armed with six  guns, anti-aircraft guns and depth charges. On 17 April at Liverpool she was commissioned into the 10th Cruiser Squadron as HMS Alcantara. Arlanza and Andes were also commissioned into the 10th Cruiser Squadron, which joined the Northern Patrol, part of the Blockade of Germany.

Guben, a 4,962 gross register tons (GRT) German-Australian Line freighter, was converted to a auxiliary cruiser and renamed . The cruiser was armed with four hidden  guns, a  gun and two torpedo tubes. Greif had a complement of around 360 officers and men and had orders to sail around the north of Iceland into the Atlantic via the Denmark Strait to operate as a commerce raider and then make for German East Africa, if it could not return to Germany.

Prelude
Greif departed its home port of Hamburg into the North Sea on 27 February; at noon on 28 February, the Admiralty warned Jellicoe that a ship, escorted by the submarine SM U-70  ahead until Lat. 59° 20' N, had left the Elbe. Admiral Sir John Jellicoe ordered two cruisers and four destroyers from Rosyth into the North Sea, to block the path of the ship if it sailed west and the light cruisers  (Captain Alan Geoffrey Hotham), Calliope and Blanche with the destroyer HMS Munster, from Scapa Flow (Scapa), to sweep the Norwegian coast in case it sailed north. Just after midnight, British wireless direction-finders identified a German ship off Egersund on the south-west coast of Norway and the light cruisers from Scapa were ordered to search an arc radiating from Egersund. Columbella and Patia of the 10th Cruiser Squadron, part of the Northern Patrol, were sent to search from the north end of the Shetland Isles to the north-east. The auxiliary cruiser HMS Andes, 15,620 GRT, (Captain G. B. W. Young) was already there, having arrived to relieve , 16,034 GRT, (Captain Thomas Erskine Wardle), which was due to sail to Liverpool to re-coal.

Action

Unbeknownst to him, the smoke was from SMS Greif. A few minutes later Andes signalled "Enemy in sight north-east 15 knots" []. Wardle ordered Alcantara to turn north at maximum speed and soon sighted a ship with one funnel, flying Norwegian flags. Another message from Andes described a two-funnelled ship and the identity of the ship in sight remained doubtful. A few minutes later, Andes was seen to starboard, apparently steaming north-east at speed, as if in pursuit. Before joining the chase, Wardle decided to examine the unknown ship, went to action stations and fired two blanks to force it heave to. By 09:20, Wardle had received a signal by Andes that it had altered course to the south-east, which only added to the ambiguity, because the ship hove to could not be the one being pursued. The lookouts on the Alcantara could see the Norwegian name Rena on the stern and that the ship looked authentic.

A boat was lowered from Alcantara when it was about  astern to check the ship's particulars, as the voyage of the Rena had been notified to the Admiralty. Wardle signalled to the Andes of developments and Young replied with "This is the suspicious ship". As the message was being read, a gun at the stern of the "Rena" was unmasked and flaps fell down along the sides, revealing more guns. Greif opened fire, hitting the boat containing the boarding party and damaging Alcantara's telemotor steering gear before the British ship could reply. Alcantara's gunners opened fire and the ship closed with the raider as it began to get under way. For about fifteen minutes the ships exchanged fire; Andes opened fire as it arrived and Greif began to disappear in smoke. The German gunners ceased fire and boats full of survivors were seen pulling away from the smoke. Alcantara was badly damaged and also ceased fire, apparently torpedoed and listing to port; Wardle ordered an abandon ship and by  the list had put Alcantara on its beam ends (on the brink of capsizing); it sank with 69 members of the crew.

Hotham in Comus, the most northern of the cruisers from Scapa, had seen the signals from Andes and sailed south in company with the destroyer Munster; he arrived as the action ended, beginning rescue work with the crew of the Alcantara as it sank. Andes had reported a submarine between it and the lifeboats and could not close; after several submarine alarms, Comus and Andes moved closer to the wreck of Greif and sank it with gunfire; about 220 men of its crew of 360 were rescued.

Aftermath

Analysis
Four British warships had encountered Greif which had been sunk; Wardle in Alcantara was later criticised for manoeuvring too close to the raider before properly identifying the ship, which out-gunned his ship. The mistake cost Wardle his vessel and several casualties but he was awarded the Distinguished Service Order and eventually reached the rank of rear admiral. The swift end to the voyage of the Greif led to the German Admiralty suspending commerce raiding and renewing their emphasis on submarine warfare.

Order of battle

Royal Navy:
 , light cruiser
 HMS Alcantara, auxiliary cruiser, flagship
 HMS Andes, auxiliary cruiser
 , destroyer

German Navy:
 , auxiliary cruiser

Footnotes

References

Further reading

External links
 HMS Alcantara

Conflicts in 1916
Naval battles of World War I involving Germany
Naval battles of World War I involving the United Kingdom
North Sea operations of World War I
February 1916 events